Hoseynabad-e Taqi (also Romanized as Ḩoseynābād-e Taqī; also known as Ḩoseynābād) is a village in Bala Velayat Rural District, Bala Velayat District, Bakharz County, Razavi Khorasan Province, Iran. At the 2006 census, its population was 51, in 9 families.

References 

Populated places in Bakharz County